The 2008 Estonian Figure Skating Championships were held at the Tartu Lõunakeskuse Jäähall in Tartu from December 15 through 16th, 2007. Skaters competed in the disciplines of men's singles, ladies' singles, pair skating, and ice dancing on the senior and junior levels.

The junior compulsory dance was the Cha-Cha Congelado.

Notes
Reigning ladies' champion Jelena Glebova and ice dancing champions Grethe Grünberg / Kristian Rand did not compete due to injury.

Senior results

Men

Ladies

Pairs

Junior results

Ladies

Ice dancing

External links
 2008 Estonian Championships results

2007 in figure skating
Estonian Figure Skating Championships, 2008
Estonian Figure Skating Championships
Figure Skating Championships
Figure Skating